The 14th constituency of Bouches-du-Rhône is a French legislative constituency in Bouches-du-Rhône.

Deputies

Elections

2022

 
 
 
 
 
 
 
 
|-
| colspan="8" bgcolor="#E9E9E9"|
|-

2017

2012

|- style="background-color:#E9E9E9;text-align:center;"
! colspan="2" rowspan="2" style="text-align:left;" | Candidate
! rowspan="2" colspan="2" style="text-align:left;" | Party
! colspan="2" | 1st round
! colspan="2" | 2nd round
|- style="background-color:#E9E9E9;text-align:center;"
! width="75" | Votes
! width="30" | %
! width="75" | Votes
! width="30" | %
|-
| style="background-color:" |
| style="text-align:left;" | Jean-David Ciot
| style="text-align:left;" | Socialist Party
| PS
| 
| 35.60%
| 
| 53.55%
|-
| style="background-color:" |
| style="text-align:left;" | Maryse Joissains-Masini
| style="text-align:left;" | Union for a Popular Movement
| UMP
| 
| 28.54%
| 
| 46.45%
|-
| style="background-color:" |
| style="text-align:left;" | Josyane Solari
| style="text-align:left;" | Front National
| FN
| 
| 14.15%
| colspan="2" style="text-align:left;" |
|-
| style="background-color:" |
| style="text-align:left;" | Michel Boulan
| style="text-align:left;" | Miscellaneous Right
| DVD
| 
| 8.33%
| colspan="2" style="text-align:left;" |
|-
| style="background-color:" |
| style="text-align:left;" | Josiane Durrieu
| style="text-align:left;" | Left Front
| FG
| 
| 5.96%
| colspan="2" style="text-align:left;" |
|-
| style="background-color:" |
| style="text-align:left;" | Geneviève Hamy
| style="text-align:left;" | Europe Ecology – The Greens
| EELV
| 
| 4.05%
| colspan="2" style="text-align:left;" |
|-
| style="background-color:" |
| style="text-align:left;" | Joséfa Maunier
| style="text-align:left;" | Ecologist
| ECO
| 
| 0.87%
| colspan="2" style="text-align:left;" |
|-
| style="background-color:" |
| style="text-align:left;" | Philippe Neveu
| style="text-align:left;" | Miscellaneous Right
| DVD
| 
| 0.76%
| colspan="2" style="text-align:left;" |
|-
| style="background-color:" |
| style="text-align:left;" | Pierre Cayol
| style="text-align:left;" | Miscellaneous Right
| DVD
| 
| 0.71%
| colspan="2" style="text-align:left;" |
|-
| style="background-color:" |
| style="text-align:left;" | Bertrand Robert
| style="text-align:left;" | Other
| AUT
| 
| 0.42%
| colspan="2" style="text-align:left;" |
|-
| style="background-color:" |
| style="text-align:left;" | François Lefebvre
| style="text-align:left;" | Far Left
| EXG
| 
| 0.35%
| colspan="2" style="text-align:left;" |
|-
| style="background-color:" |
| style="text-align:left;" | Charlotte Maria
| style="text-align:left;" | Far Left
| EXG
| 
| 0.27%
| colspan="2" style="text-align:left;" |
|-
| style="background-color:" |
| style="text-align:left;" | Malik Houamria
| style="text-align:left;" | Ecologist
| ECO
| 
| 0.00%
| colspan="2" style="text-align:left;" |
|-
| colspan="8" style="background-color:#E9E9E9;"|
|- style="font-weight:bold"
| colspan="4" style="text-align:left;" | Total
| 
| 100%
| 
| 100%
|-
| colspan="8" style="background-color:#E9E9E9;"|
|-
| colspan="4" style="text-align:left;" | Registered voters
| 
| style="background-color:#E9E9E9;"|
| 
| style="background-color:#E9E9E9;"|
|-
| colspan="4" style="text-align:left;" | Blank/Void ballots
| 
| 1.11%
| 
| 3.04%
|-
| colspan="4" style="text-align:left;" | Turnout
| 
| 59.13%
| 
| 59.35%
|-
| colspan="4" style="text-align:left;" | Abstentions
| 
| 40.87%
| 
| 40.65%
|-
| colspan="8" style="background-color:#E9E9E9;"|
|- style="font-weight:bold"
| colspan="6" style="text-align:left;" | Result
| colspan="2" style="background-color:" | PS GAIN FROM UMP
|}

2007

|- style="background-color:#E9E9E9;text-align:center;"
! colspan="2" rowspan="2" style="text-align:left;" | Candidate
! rowspan="2" colspan="2" style="text-align:left;" | Party
! colspan="2" | 1st round
! colspan="2" | 2nd round
|- style="background-color:#E9E9E9;text-align:center;"
! width="75" | Votes
! width="30" | %
! width="75" | Votes
! width="30" | %
|-
| style="background-color:" |
| style="text-align:left;" | Maryse Joissains Masini
| style="text-align:left;" | Union for a Popular Movement
| UMP
| 
| 44.63%
| 
| 54.86%
|-
| style="background-color:" |
| style="text-align:left;" | Alexandre Medvedowsky
| style="text-align:left;" | Socialist Party
| PS
| 
| 26.84%
| 
| 45.14%
|-
| style="background-color:" |
| style="text-align:left;" | Brigitte Devesa
| style="text-align:left;" | Democratic Movement
| MoDem
| 
| 9.58%
| colspan="2" style="text-align:left;" |
|-
| style="background-color:" |
| style="text-align:left;" | Honoré Beyer
| style="text-align:left;" | Front National
| FN
| 
| 3.92%
| colspan="2" style="text-align:left;" |
|-
| style="background-color:" |
| style="text-align:left;" | Josiane Durrieu
| style="text-align:left;" | Communist
| PCF
| 
| 2.74%
| colspan="2" style="text-align:left;" |
|-
| style="background-color:" |
| style="text-align:left;" | Laurent Perallat
| style="text-align:left;" | The Greens
| VEC
| 
| 2.49%
| colspan="2" style="text-align:left;" |
|-
| style="background-color:" |
| style="text-align:left;" | Cédric Bottero
| style="text-align:left;" | Far Left
| EXG
| 
| 1.97%
| colspan="2" style="text-align:left;" |
|-
| style="background-color:" |
| style="text-align:left;" | Jean-Pierre Borne
| style="text-align:left;" | Independent
| DIV
| 
| 1.40%
| colspan="2" style="text-align:left;" |
|-
| style="background-color:" |
| style="text-align:left;" | Valérie Poussel
| style="text-align:left;" | Movement for France
| MPF
| 
| 1.40%
| colspan="2" style="text-align:left;" |
|-
| style="background-color:" |
| style="text-align:left;" | Monique Ferrie
| style="text-align:left;" | Ecologist
| ECO
| 
| 1.05%
| colspan="2" style="text-align:left;" |
|-
| style="background-color:" |
| style="text-align:left;" | Catherine Villa
| style="text-align:left;" | Ecologist
| ECO
| 
| 0.93%
| colspan="2" style="text-align:left;" |
|-
| style="background-color:" |
| style="text-align:left;" | Virginie Devallet
| style="text-align:left;" | Hunting, Fishing, Nature, Traditions
| CPNT
| 
| 0.72%
| colspan="2" style="text-align:left;" |
|-
| style="background-color:" |
| style="text-align:left;" | Yves Martinez
| style="text-align:left;" | Independent
| DIV
| 
| 0.63%
| colspan="2" style="text-align:left;" |
|-
| style="background-color:" |
| style="text-align:left;" | Vincent Autric
| style="text-align:left;" | Far Right
| EXD
| 
| 0.59%
| colspan="2" style="text-align:left;" |
|-
| style="background-color:" |
| style="text-align:left;" | Sonia Pennavayre
| style="text-align:left;" | Miscellaneous Right
| DVD
| 
| 0.58%
| colspan="2" style="text-align:left;" |
|-
| style="background-color:" |
| style="text-align:left;" | Noëlle Lagrange
| style="text-align:left;" | Far Left
| EXG
| 
| 0.38%
| colspan="2" style="text-align:left;" |
|-
| style="background-color:" |
| style="text-align:left;" | Francis Figarols
| style="text-align:left;" | Miscellaneous Right
| DVD
| 
| 0.15%
| colspan="2" style="text-align:left;" |
|-
| colspan="8" style="background-color:#E9E9E9;"|
|- style="font-weight:bold"
| colspan="4" style="text-align:left;" | Total
| 
| 100%
| 
| 100%
|-
| colspan="8" style="background-color:#E9E9E9;"|
|-
| colspan="4" style="text-align:left;" | Registered voters
| 
| style="background-color:#E9E9E9;"|
| 
| style="background-color:#E9E9E9;"|
|-
| colspan="4" style="text-align:left;" | Blank/Void ballots
| 
| 1.38%
| 
| 3.81%
|-
| colspan="4" style="text-align:left;" | Turnout
| 
| 59.91%
| 
| 58.42%
|-
| colspan="4" style="text-align:left;" | Abstentions
| 
| 40.09%
| 
| 41.58%
|-
| colspan="8" style="background-color:#E9E9E9;"|
|- style="font-weight:bold"
| colspan="6" style="text-align:left;" | Result
| colspan="2" style="background-color:" | UMP HOLD
|}

2002

 
 
 
 
 
 
 
|-
| colspan="8" bgcolor="#E9E9E9"|
|-

1997

 
 
 
 
 
 
|-
| colspan="8" bgcolor="#E9E9E9"|
|-

References

14